Babatunde Ajagbe (born 25 June 1987) is a Nigerian male squash player. He achieved his highest career ranking of 144 on December, 2014 during the 2014 PSA World Tour.

References 

1987 births
Living people
Nigerian male squash players
Sportspeople from Abeokuta
21st-century Nigerian people